Großer Labussee is a lake in the Mecklenburg Lake District, in Germany. It is situated in the district of Mecklenburgische Seenplatte of the state of Mecklenburg-Vorpommern. Most of the lake is in the municipality Userin, with a small southern part in the municipality Wesenberg.

The Havel is generally navigable downstream of Zwenzow lock, but upstream of the lock powered craft are prohibited.

References

External links 
 

Lakes of Mecklenburg-Western Pomerania
LGrosserLabussee